Dmitri Lebedev (in Estonian sources Dimitri Lebedev; 28 July 1872 Pärnu County – 8 January 1935 Tallinn) was a Russian military personnel (since 1917 Major-General).

In 1895 he was graduated from Vilnius Military School, and in 1904 General Staff Academy. He participated in the Russo-Japanese War. He participated also in World War I.

In 1921 he moved to Estonia. He was a lector at Estonian Military Academy. In 1927 he retired.

References

1872 births
1935 deaths
Russian military personnel of the Russo-Japanese War
People from Pärnu County
Russian military personnel of World War I